Mogol or Moghol may refer to:

 Moghol people, ethnic group in Afghanistan
 Moghol language, Mongolic language of Afghanistan
 Mogol, Jalal-Abad, a town in Kyrgyzstan
 Mogol, Tajikistan, a town in Tajikistan
 Mogol (lyricist), real name Giulio Rapetti
 An alternative spelling of Mughal
 Il gran mogol (The Grand Moghul), Indian flute concerto by Antonio Vivaldi
 Il gran Mogol, libretto by Lalli
 Le grand mogol, opera by Edmond Audran
 Le Grand Mogol, retail shop in Paris by Rose Bertin

See also
 Mogul (disambiguation)
 Moghuls (disambiguation)
 Mughal (disambiguation)